Greatest Hits is a compilation album by teen pop singer Tiffany. It is a collection of her 12 best songs (her first to be distributed in the United States) and was issued in 1996 by Hip-O (distributed by MCA Records).

Track listing
 "I Think We're Alone Now" (from the album Tiffany)
 "Danny" (from the album Tiffany)
 "All This Time" (from the album Hold An Old Friend's Hand)
 "It's the Lover (Not the Love)" (from the album Hold An Old Friend's Hand)
 "I Saw Him Standing There" (from the album Tiffany)
 "Hold an Old Friend's Hand" (from the album Hold An Old Friend's Hand)
 "Radio Romance" (from the album Hold An Old Friend's Hand)
 "Feelings of Forever" (from the album Tiffany)
 "Back in the Groove" (from the album New Inside)
 "Mr. Mambo" (B-side to single "I Saw Him Standing There")
 "Here in My Heart" (from the album New Inside)
 "Could've Been" (from the album Tiffany)

Critical reception

AllMusic's Stephen Thomas Erlewine gave a middling review of the compilation, suggesting "Tiffany's music hasn't dated particularly well -- the synthesizers and dance-machines will always sound like 1987 -- but for anyone wanting a collection of all of her finest moments, Greatest Hits more than fits the bill."

Entertainment Weekly was a bit more positive in their review, writing "When Tiffany debuted in 1987, she conveyed teenage confusion and blossoming desire in a voice as ratty as her thrift-shop wardrobe. She even spoofed her own mall-rascal image over hot Latin rhythms in ”Mr. Mambo,” a rare B-side until now. The other 11 tracks on 'Greatest Hits,' five of which come from her first album, are less obscure. Although Tiffany’s music digressed into adult-ballad careerism, this set mainly proves how unrestrained her sonic youth sounded."

Tiffany.org, a fan site run by Daniel Tobias, had this to say: "Despite early rumors, it does not have any new tracks, and does not include any of the tracks from overseas releases that are hard to find in America. The only B-side track included is (inexplicably) "Mr. Mambo", easily Tiffany's silliest song. There are lots of great Tiffany B-sides, like "Can't Stop A Heartbeat" and "Ruthless", that would have been nice to have on this CD."

References 

1996 compilation albums
Tiffany Darwish albums